Fritz Zeuner (1921-1982) was an East German politician, who was Chairman of the Peasants Mutual Aid Association from 1979 to 1982. 

He served in the Wehrmacht in World War II, and joined the Communist Party of Germany in 1945. He attended the University of Leipzig, where he studied economics. Zeuner was active in the VdgB from its founding in the late 1940s, and was director of the Academy of Agricultural Sciences in Berlin from 1953 to 1961. In 1979, he became Chairman of the VdgB, and remained at that post until his death in 1982.

References

1921 births
1982 deaths
People from Altenburger Land
Communist Party of Germany members
Socialist Unity Party of Germany politicians
Peasants Mutual Aid Association members
Leipzig University alumni
German military personnel of World War II
Recipients of the Patriotic Order of Merit in silver